Girgit is a 2019 Indian budget was 5 lakh Tulu-language comedy drama film produced by Shoolin Films and Manjunath Attavar. The film was theatrically released in India on 23 August 2019. It stars Roopesh Shetty, Shilpa Shetty, Roshan Shetty, Naveen D Padil, Bhojaraj Vamanjoor, Aravind Bolar, Sandeep Shetty, Prasanna Shetty and Umesh Mijar. The story of the film was written by Roopesh Shetty, and jointly directed by Roopesh Shetty and Rakesh Kadri and became a highest grossing Tulu film of all time.

Plot 

A young man falls in love with a girl of his dream, and eventually the Girl also falls in love with him. But, the young man has to face many weird, funny and tough situations in the process to get married to that girl, as the girl has other commitments to oblige. Will the young man be able to succeed in getting his girl or has to face other consequences forms this entertaining story.

Cast 
 Roopesh Shetty
 Shilpa Shetty
 Roshan Shetty
 Aravind Bolar
 Naveen D Padil
 Bhojaraj Vamanjoor
 Umesh Mijar
 Sandeep Shetty Manibettu
 Prasanna Shetty

Music 
The music was composed by  Joel Rebello and Darrel Mascarenhas.

Release
The film released in the United Arab Emirates on 22 August 2019. The release of the film in Mangaluru was briefly stopped by the court because it showed judges in poor light.

Reception 
A critic from daijiworld.com opined that "A four out of five and a thumbs up for director Roopesh Shetty and Rakesh Shetty for bringing out such a rollercoaster of entertainment. Sometimes, a good laugh is all you need to make your day. Don’t miss this one, because Girgit is a laugh riot".

Box office 
The film's box office collection stood at Rs 10 crore worldwide after more than 700 shows.

References

Tulu-language films
Indian comedy films
2019 films
2019 comedy films